The 2018–19 Sacramento State Hornets women's basketball team represents California State University, Sacramento during the 2018–19 NCAA Division I women's basketball season. The Hornets were led by sixth year head coach Bunky Harkleroad and play their home games at Hornets Nest. They were members of the Big Sky Conference. They finished the season 10–19, 6–14 in Big Sky play to finish in ninth place. They lost in the first round of the Big Sky women's tournament to Northern Arizona.

Roster

Schedule

|-
!colspan=9 style=| Exhibition

|-
!colspan=9 style=| Non-conference regular season

|-
!colspan=9 style=| Big Sky regular season

|-
!colspan=9 style=| Big Sky Women's Tournament

See also
2018–19 Sacramento State Hornets men's basketball team

References

Sacramento State Hornets women's basketball seasons
Sacramento State